HMS Cottesmore was a  of the British Royal Navy, launched in 1982 and converted in 1997 into a patrol vessel. The ship was declared surplus to requirement and put on the MoD list for disposal in 2004.

When introduced, the Hunt-class vessels were the largest warships ever built out of glass-reinforced plastic.

Lieutenant Commander Prince Andrew, Duke of York commanded Cottesmore from April 1993 until November 1994. She was decommissioned by the Royal Navy in September 2005. The ship's bell and other memorabilia were presented to the village of Cottesmore in Rutland.

The ship entered service with the Lithuanian Navy as M53 Skalvis. Thales was the prime contractor to upgrade the vessels with a technologically advanced minehunting system including the hull-mounted Sonar 2193 system, propulsion, command and control systems, and mine disposal systems.

References

 

Hunt-class mine countermeasures vessels
1982 ships